This is a list of the longest undammed rivers of the world, ordered by length.

See also
 List of largest unfragmented rivers

Lists of rivers
undammed